Sanford "Sandy" Noyes McDonnell (October 12, 1922 – March 19, 2012) was an American engineer, businessman and philanthropist. Former chairman and chief executive officer of McDonnell Douglas Corporation, he also served as national president of the Boy Scouts of America and as chairman of Character Education Partnership. He was "Man of the Year" in St. Louis in 1984.

Career
A native of Little Rock, Arkansas, McDonnell attended Princeton University, the University of Colorado Boulder and Washington University, achieving bachelor's degrees in economics (1945) and mechanical engineering (1948) and a master's degree in applied mechanics (1954). In 1948, he joined McDonnell Aircraft Corporation, a company founded by his uncle, James S. McDonnell, as a stress engineer. He participated in the development of the F-101 Voodoo and the F-4 Phantom II jet fighters. In 1962 he was named vice president-general manager of all combat aircraft, and he became the president of the company, by then McDonnell Douglas, in 1971. The following year, he became chief executive officer. In 1980, James S. McDonnell died, and McDonnell succeeded him as chairman of the board, a role he retained until 1988. He has also been chairman of the board of governors of the Aerospace Industries Association.

Arkansas Aviation Historical Society inducted McDonnell into the Arkansas Aviation Hall of Fame in 1989.

Philanthropy
During his service with McDonnell Douglas, McDonnell had a strong interest in ethics. As a child, he had been a Boy Scout, rising to the rank of Star Scout. During his term with McDonnell Douglas, he used the Scout Promise as the basis for a work Code of Ethics. Following his retirement, McDonnell turned his focus to education and the need of focusing on character in public schools. After establishing a program in St. Louis public schools (the Personal Responsibility Education Process), he became founding chair of the national Character Education Partnership in 1993, a position he held until 2005.

McDonnell worked to translate the character education programs of the Boy Scouts to higher education through service academies. "The military academies are far ahead of almost all of the other universities in the emphasis they place on character building," he once said. "I hope universities all across the nation will emulate their programs for character development." He pledged $5 million to the U.S. Air Force Academy in 2011 for a Center for Character and Leadership Development.

McDonnell also served in other areas. In 1987, he became the first president of the Foundation for the Malcolm Baldrige National Quality Award, a foundation that supports the Baldrige Performance Excellence Program in recognizing U.S. organizations that "have a role-model organizational management system that ensures continuous improvement in the delivery of products and/or services, demonstrates efficient and effective operations, and provides a way of engaging and responding to customers and other stakeholders."

See also

References

1922 births
2012 deaths
American chief executives of manufacturing companies
Businesspeople in aviation
Little Rock Central High School alumni
McDonnell Douglas
Businesspeople from Little Rock, Arkansas
Princeton University alumni
University of Colorado alumni
Washington University in St. Louis alumni
Members of the United States National Academy of Engineering
Presidents of the Boy Scouts of America